This is a list of civil townships in South Dakota and their counties, based on United States Geological Survey and U.S. Census data.

See also
 List of counties in South Dakota
 List of cities in South Dakota
 List of towns in South Dakota

References

 U.S. Board on Geographic Names
 U.S. Census Bureau TIGER/Line

Townships
South Dakota